Flint Community Schools is a school district headquartered in Flint, Michigan, United States. For the 2011-2012 school year, the Flint Community Schools had both middle schools, four elementary schools and one high school placed in the bottom 5% of all schools in the State of Michigan based on student achievement and attendance.  The school district accommodated a total student population  of about 30,000 students. It included two early childhood education centers, 18 elementary schools, and three secondary schools.

History 
The current mission statement of "developing a community of learners who are prepared to live, work, and contribute to an ever changing society" was developed by Walter Milton, who became Superintendent in 2005. Milton subsequently wrote a book entitled Me in the Making which included a chapter on his stormy tenure in Flint.

In November 2012, Superintendent Linda Thompson announced her retirement. Thompson, 57, is a Flint native who has worked 36 years with the district in several roles. She worked her way up the ranks from teacher to assistant principal, to principal before coming to the administration building and her eventual selection as superintendent. Linda Thompson, a native of Flint and graduate of the University of Michigan School of Education assumed the Superintendentship in 2008 and set about downsizing the District by closing schools. In late 2011 the District was found to be running a deficit of 3.7 million dollars by the accounting firm of Yeo and Yeo. In early 2012 the Flint School Board opted not to extend Superintendent Thompson's contract beyond the current year, citing the deficit and her previous effectiveness rating of 2.7 out a possible 4.0 points. Mrs. Thompson continued on a one-year contract, but in November 2012, on the heels of the discovery of an even larger budget deficit than the year before, she announced her retirement.

In December 2012, Lawrence Watkins Jr. was selected to serve as the Districts Interim Superintendent. Watkins was a longtime Flint School District employee. He graduated from Flint Central High School in 1971 and then graduated from Hillsdale College on a football scholarship in 1975. He's worked for the district, in some capacity, "since I was 14 years of age," he has said. He was a locker room attendant in high school. After college, Watkins became varsity wrestling coach at Central High. In 1986, he became staff assistant for the district's office of pupil personnel services. He held several other positions in the administration office before retiring as director of pupil personnel services in 2012. He also served as director of school safety and security. Larry Watkins helped the Flint School District usher in a comprehensive educational plan, negotiate concessions from bargaining units and collaborate with community organizations to bring back the community education model that put Flint schools on the map. At the same time, Watkins saw Flint schools' deficit grow from $4 million to $21.9 million in a little over two years, thousands of students leave the district and numerous school buildings closed. On April 8, 2015, Mr. Watkins announced his retirement.

In August 2018, The Flint Community Schools selected Derrick Lopez, JD as its new Superintendent. One of his first acts was to secure funding from the Elon Musk Foundation in the amount of $480,350 to replace each water fountain in all of the Flint Community Schools with new water stations and two filtration systems: carbon filtration to remove the lead and ultraviolet filtration to remove other chemicals and soluble particulates.

In June 2020, Anita Steward took over the helm at Flint Community Schools.  Mrs. Stewart is a product of Flint schools.  Before becoming the superintendent, Mrs. Steward was the Assistant Superintendent.  She has also been a building principal and elementary teacher in the district.
https://www.mlive.com/news/flint/2020/06/anita-steward-takes-over-as-flint-community-schools-superintendent.html

As of December 2018, Flint Community Schools have agreed to switch to the balanced school calendar for the 2019-2020 school year. This will affect all schools in the district. Freeman was the only school with a balanced calendar before the change.

The city of Flint's two oldest schools were Flint Central High School (formerly Flint City High School) and Flint Northern High School. Due to administrative decisions and budget cuts, Flint Central High School, founded in 1875, is not currently in operation; Flint Northern High School, founded in 1929, ranked in the bottom 1% of Michigan secondary schools and was also closed in 2013. Both institutions experienced relocation from their original sites.

Schools

Active
High School (Grades 9-12)

 Southwestern Classical Academy (formerly Southwestern High School)

Junior High School (7-8)

 Flint Junior High School (formerly Northwestern High School, Flint Northwestern Preparatory Academy, Flint Northwestern-Edison Community High School)

Elementary Schools (Grades K-6)
 Brownell Elementary School - Grades K-2 (STEM School - Science, Technology, Engineering and Math)
 Doyle/Ryder Elementary School (incorporates Doyle School, built in 1902)
 Durant-Tuuri-Mott Elementary School
 Eisenhower Elementary School
 Freeman Elementary School
 Neithercut Elementary School
Holmes Elementary School - now a STEM (Science, Technology, Engineering and Math) School Grade 3-6
 Pierce Elementary School
 Potter Elementary School
 Scott Elementary School

Other
 Accelerated Learning Academy

Former
Closed
 Bryant Elementary - 201 E. Pierson Road - 2013
 Carpenter Road Elementary - Closed 2015
 Central High School - 601 Crapo St- 1923-2009
 Civic Park Elementary School - 1402 W. Dayton St. - 1922-2009 (abandoned)
 Cook Elementary - 500 Welch Blvd. - 2002
 Dort Elementary - 601 E. Witherbee St. - 2013
 Garfield Elementary School- 301 E. McClellan St.- 1928-2009
 Johnson Elementary School - 5323 Western Road - 1967-2006 (last used as Johnson AAA School, now closed)
 King Elementary School - 520 W. Rankin St.
 Longfellow Middle School - 1255 N. Chevrolet Ave. - 2006
 Lowell Jr. High-  3301 N Vernon Ave- 1929-2003 (Alternative middle school 1988-2003) - abandoned
 McKinley Middle School - 4501 Camden Ave. - 1929-2012
 Merrill Elementary School- 1501 W. Moore St- 1953-2009
 Northern High School #2, (Renamed Northern Academy and closed in 2014)
 Stewart Elementary School-  1950 Burr Blvd.- 1955-2009
 Washington Elementary School - 1400 N. Vernon Avenue - 1922-2013 - burned down October 7, 2021, demolished
 Whittier Middle School - 800 Crapo Street - 1925-2008
 Wilkins Elementary - 121 E. York Ave. - 2010
 Williams Elementary - 3501 Minnesota Ave. - Closed 2010
 Zimmerman Elementary School - 2421 Corunna Rd. - Closed 2013
 The Flint Academy (7-12)(1976-1988) - Corner of McClellan and Buick in the original Flint Northern Building - Bldg. 1928 - 1988
Clark Elementary School - Harrison St - built in 1912; closed in 1977 Demolished 2014
 Cody Elementary School - 3201 Fenton Road - closed 2003 - Demolished December 2012
 Homedale Elementary School -  1501 Davison Road - 1914-2003 - added onto in 1922 & 1966 -(burned on September 11, 2010-now a vacant lot)
 Kennedy Center - an alternative school - Saginaw Street -after closing, Schools of Choice was opened as a replacement - demolished 2011
 Lewis Elementary School - 1911 - became Lowell Jr. High Annex in 1978 - demolished 1991
 Martin Community Elementary School - 6502 Stafford Place - 1924-2002 (razed in 2011- now vacant lot)
 Pierson Elementary School - 300 E. Mott Ave. - 2002 demolished 2013
 Stevenson Elementary School - 6th Ave. - 1911 - became Rankin School, demolished
 School of Choice - 517 E. 5th Avenue  - Formerly St. Michael's High School, became The Center For Hope in 2010, demolished 2017)

Redeveloped  
 Anderson Elementary School - 3248 Mackin Road - 1965-2009 (Sold in 2015 to Empowered Enterprise Inc.)
 Bunche Elementary - 4121 Martin Luther King Blvd. - 2012 (Now Bunche Community Center)
 Coolidge Elementary School - 3615 Van Buren Ave. - 1928-2011 - Sold to Communities First Inc. of Flint for use as offices, housing,  etc.
 Cummings Elementary School -Became Great Expectations Early Childhood Center 2016
 Dewey Elementary School - 4119 N. Saginaw St. - Now the Sylvester Broome Empowerment Village
 Emerson Jr. High - later became The Flint Academy - Pasadena - now been demolished (Land now owned by Shiloh Commons Apartments)
 Gundry Community Elementary School - 6031 Dupont St. - 2008 (now Cathedral of Faith Ministries)
 Jefferson Elementary School - 5306 North Street - (last used as Northridge Academy, Now 2nd Chance Baptist Church of Flint)
 Lawndale Avenue Elementary School- 3115 Lawndale Avenue - (Now St. Luke's N.E.W. Life Center)
 Lincoln Elementary School - 2820 S. Saginaw St. - (became charter school International Academy of Flint in 1999)
 Manley Elementary School - 3002 Farley Street - Now an early child care and special development center: "Flint Head Start"
 Northern High School #1, Flint Academy - McClellan Street - demolished (Land now owned by Shiloh Commons Apartments)
 Oak Elementary School - 1000 Oak Street - 1890-1976 (Reopened in 2014 as Oak Street Senior Housing)
 Selby Academy (Sold and became Eagles Nest Academy in 2015) 
 Sobey Elementary School - 3701 N. Averill Avenue - 2003 (Now Boys & Girls Club Of Greater Flint)
 Summerfield Elementary School - 1360 Milbourne Ave. - 1970-2012 (reopened as early childcare center)

References

External links
 Flint Community Schools
 
 GASC Technology Center

School districts in Michigan
Education in Genesee County, Michigan
Education in Flint, Michigan